is an anime series directed by Jun'ichi Sakata and produced by Gonzo. They are based on the light novel series Kaze no Stigma by Takahiro Yamato, and adapt the source material over twenty-four episodes. The plot of the episodes is based on the return of Kazuma Kannagi to Japan after being exiled by his clan, and his subsequent interactions with his clan.

The series aired from April 2007 to September 2007 in Japan on thirteen networks, with Chiba TV, Fukui TV, Tokyo MX TV, TV Hokkaido, and TV Saitama airing the episodes first on 11 April 2007. The remaining networks began airing the episodes later in May, with the exception of Kumamoto Broadcasting, which broadcast the first episode on 14 May 2007.

The series is dubbed and licensed in North America by Funimation Entertainment. Another English dubbed version by Animax Asia aired on their network from 19 May to 21 June 2010.

Four pieces of theme music are used for the episodes; one opening theme and three ending themes. The opening theme is "blast of wind" by Saori Kiuji. The ending themes are Kiuju's "Hitorikiri no Sora" and "Matataki no Kiwoku" by Ayumi Fujimura, Yuka Inokuchi and Shizuka Itō, with either played for all episodes save episode twelve, which features Sakai Tanako's "Tsuki Hana no Inori." A single for "blast of wind" was released on 30 May 2007, and a single for the closing themes was released on 18 August 2007.

Twelve DVD compilations, containing two episodes of the anime, were released by Kadokawa in Japan, from 24 August 2007 to 25 July 2008.

Episodes (2007)

References

External links
Official website 
Official website at Gonzo 

Kaze no Stigma